Ishak Haleva (born 1940 in Istanbul, Turkey) is the current Hakham Bashi (Chief Rabbi) of Turkey. Chief Rabbi Haleva was the deputy to David Asseo for seven years and became the new Hakham Bashi after his death in 2002. He has been a member of Presidium Council of the Alliance of Rabbis in Islamic States.

See also
History of the Jews in Turkey
Jewish Museum of Turkey
Turkey-Israel relations
List of synagogues in Turkey

References

1940 births
Living people
Chief rabbis of Turkey
Rabbis from Istanbul
Academic staff of Marmara University
Academic staff of Sakarya University
20th-century Turkish rabbis
21st-century Turkish rabbis